Giovanni Gaetano Bottari (15 January 1689, Florence – 5 June 1775, Rome) was Vatican librarian and counsellor to Pope Clement XII.

Biography
Before he became Vatican librarian, he was director of the grand-ducal press of Tuscany and professor of ecclesiastical history and controversy in the Sapienza.

He is the author of several treatises about art and artists. Amongst his works is Dialoghi sopra le tre Arti del Disegno, published in Lucca, 1754. In these dialogues he criticizes the role of patrons, who "understand little of art" (Dialoghi II & III). He was also principal editor of the new edition of the Vocabulario della Crusca and of the celebrated Vatican edition of Virgil (1741).

Bottari was acquainted to Piranesi. He probably collaborated on Piranesi's answers to the letters of Pierre-Jean Mariette, and Piranesi dedicated his Antichità Romane de' Tempi della Repubblic to Bottari.

Works
Raccolta di Lettere sulla Pittura, Scultura, ed Architettura Scritte da' Piu Celebri Personaggi
Volume 1 
Volume 2 
Volume 3 
Volume 6 
Volume 7 
Volume 8

Sources

 Dialoghi sopra le tre arti del disegno. Benedini, Lucca 1754 digital

1689 births
1775 deaths
Writers from Florence
Italian librarians
18th-century Italian writers
18th-century Italian male writers
Academic staff of the Sapienza University of Rome